The channel catfish (Ictalurus punctatus) is North America's most numerous catfish species. It is the official fish of Kansas, Missouri, Nebraska, and Tennessee, and is informally referred to as a "channel cat". In the United States, they are the most fished catfish species with around 8 million anglers targeting them per year. They also have very few teeth and swallow food whole. The popularity of channel catfish for food has contributed to the rapid expansion of aquaculture of this species in the United States. It has also been widely introduced in Europe, Asia and South America, and it is legally considered an invasive species in many countries.

Distribution and habitat

Channel catfish are native to the Nearctic, being well distributed in lower Canada and the eastern and northern United States, as well as parts of northern Mexico. They have also been introduced into some waters of landlocked Europe (Czech Republic and Romania) and parts of Malaysia and almost as many parts of Indonesia. They thrive in small and large rivers, reservoirs, natural lakes, and ponds. Channel "cats" are cavity nesters, meaning they lay their eggs in crevices, hollows, or debris, to protect them from swift currents. In Canada, the species is largely, though not exclusively, limited to the Great Lakes watershed from Lake Nipigon southward.

Characteristics

Channel catfish possess very keen senses of smell and taste. At the pits of their nostrils (nares) are very sensitive odor-sensing organs with a very high concentration of olfactory receptors. In channel catfish, these organs are sensitive enough to detect several amino acids at about one part per 100 million in water. In addition, the channel catfish has taste buds distributed over the surface of its entire body. These buds are especially concentrated on the fish's four pair of barbels (whiskers) surrounding the mouth — about 25 buds per square millimeter. This combination of exceptional senses of taste and smell allows the channel catfish to find food in dark, stained, or muddy water with relative ease. They also possess a Weberian apparatus, which amplifies sound waves that would otherwise not be perceivable. Channel catfish's barbels have been falsely thought to sting people when touched, but they do have spines on its pectoral and dorsal fins that if not handled carefully, it can puncture skin.

Length and weight

[[File:CCatfish.png|350px|right | thumb | Weight vs. length for Channel Catfish, where b = 3.2293 and  cm.<ref>{{cite book | vauthors = Anderson RO, Neumann RM | date = 1996 | title = Length, Weight, and Associated Structural Indices", in Fisheries Techniques | edition = second | veditors = Murphy BE, Willis DW | publisher = American Fisheries Society }}</ref>]]
A member of the American catfish genus Ictalurus, channel catfish have a top-end size of about 40–50 pounds (18–23 kg). The world record channel catfish weighed 58 pounds, and was taken from the Santee-Cooper Reservoir in South Carolina, on July 7, 1964. Realistically, a channel catfish over 20 lb (9 kg) is a spectacular specimen, and most catfish anglers view a 10-lb (4.5-kg) fish as a very admirable catch. Furthermore, the average size channel catfish an angler could expect to find in most waterways would be between 2 pounds (1 kg) and 4 pounds (2 kg), and between 12 in (31 cm) and 24 in (61 cm).

Channel catfish often coexist in the same waterways with its close relative, the blue catfish, which is somewhat less common, but tends to grow much larger (with several specimens confirmed to weigh above 100 lb).

As channel catfish grow longer, they increase in weight. The relationship between length and weight is not linear. The relationship between length (L, in cm) and weight (W, in kg) for nearly all species of fish can be expressed by an equation of the form:

Invariably, b is close to 3.0 for all species,  is the length of a typical fish weighing 1 kg. For channel catfish, b = 3.2293, somewhat higher than for many common species, and  cm.

Feeding
Catfish have enhanced capabilities of taste perception, hence called the “swimming tongue”, due to the presence of taste buds all over the external body surface and inside the oropharyngeal cavity. Specifically, they have high sensitivity to amino acids, which explains their unique communication methods as follows. The catfish has a facial taste system that is extremely responsive to L-alanine and L-arginine. More specifically, their facial taste system senses heightened levels of L-amino acids in freshwater. Feeding behavior to food is due to amino acids released by food. This is reported to cause maxillary and mandibular barbell movements, which orient the catfish's posture and food search. When the food stimulates the taste receptors, it causes more excitation which see as exaggerated biting, turning, or mastication.

 Diet 
Adult channel catfish, over 45 cm (17.7 in), consume fishes such as yellow perch and sunfish. The diet of adults consists of snails, clams, crustaceans (such as crayfish), snakes, frogs, small fish, insects, aquatic plants, algae, seeds, grains, nuts, and even small birds and small mammals occasionally. Younger channel catfish are more consistently omnivorous, eating a large variety of plants and animals.

Communication
The channel catfish is adapted to limited light conditions. Members of the genus Ictalurus'', which inhabit muddy waters, do not depend solely on visual cues. Instead, they are known to rely heavily on chemotaxic cues. Sound production may be another important means of communication among channel catfish and other species living in turbid habitats.

Chemical communication

The North American channel catfish is an ostariophysan, or a bony fish occupying a freshwater habitat. These fishes are known to produce club cells and alarm substances for communication purposes. Both the fish's habitat and the presence of chemosensory cells covering the body are presumably the results of favored selection for this method of communication. Catfishes are capable of producing and recognizing individual specific pheromones. Through these pheromones, a catfish can identify not only the species and sex of a conspecific, but also its age, size, reproductive state, or hierarchical social status.

Territoriality in channel catfish is identifiable by a change in body odor, which is recognizable by other members of the same species. This chemical change in the amino-acid composition of the skin mucus can be noted by chromatographic methods, and are not long-lasting; rather, they last only long enough to communicate to other fish in the vicinity. Changes may be the result of the release of the contents of the club cells. These cells do not open directly to the surface of the skin, but injury caused by fighting and other agonistic behaviors may release the cells’ contents. Since catfish have a dominance hierarchy system, information relative to the change of status of any fish is important in recognition of the social strata.

Signal distinction

In the channel catfish, while a communication signal is directed toward the receiver and contains a specific message, an information signal is a part of the general existence of the individual or the group. For example, release of an alarm signal will communicate danger, but the individual's recognition odor is only an information signal identifying one fish from another. With regards to the function and contents of the club cells, the club cells may serve different functions throughout the fish's lifecycle. Variation in the contents of the club cells’ information signals therefore may change with the species’ needs at different stages of life.

Sound production

All species of catfishes can generate sound through stridulation, and many produce sounds through drumming. Stridulation consists of the clicking or grinding of bony parts on the fish's pectoral fins and pectoral girdle, and drumming consists of the contraction of specialized sonic muscles with subsequent reverberation through the swim bladder. Variability in the sound signals created by the channel catfish depends on the mechanism by which the sound is produced, the function of the resultant sound, and physical factors such as sex, age, and temperature. This variation may result in increased complexity of the outgoing signal and may allow for increased usefulness of the signal in interspecies communication. In the channel catfish, sounds are produced only by pectoral stridulation, as this species does not express sonic muscles. However, the swim bladder may still be used to help with audition.

Due to the high density of water, sound travels 4.8 times faster and over longer distances under water than in air. Consequently, sound production via stridulation is an excellent means of underwater communication for channel catfish. The pectoral spine of the channel catfish is an enlarged fin ray with a slightly modified base that forms a complex articulation with several bones of the pectoral girdle. Unlike the other pectoral fin rays, the individual fin segments of the spine are hypertrophied and fused, except for at the distal tip. The surface of the spine is often ornamented with a serrated edge and venomous tissues, designed to deter predators. Sounds produced during fin abduction result from the movement of the base of the pectoral spine across the pectoral girdle channel. Each sweep of sound consists of a number of discrete pulses created by the ridges lining the base of the pectoral spine as they pass over the rough surface of the girdle's channel. The stridulation sounds are extremely variable due to the range and flexibility of motion in fin use. Different sounds may be used for different functions in communication, such as in behavior towards predators and in asserting dominance.

In many channel catfish, individuals favor one fin or another for stridulatory sound production (in the same way as humans are right-handed or left-handed). The first ray of the channel catfish pectoral fin is a bilaterally symmetrical spinous structure that is minimally important for movement; however, it can be locked as a defensive adaptation or used as a means for sound production. According to one scholar, most fish tend to produce sound with their right fin, although sound production with the left fin has also been observed.

Hearing
The inferior division of the inner ear, most prominently the utricle, is considered the primary area of hearing in most fishes. The hearing ability of the channel catfish is enhanced by the presence of the swim bladder. It is the main structure that reverberates the echo from other individuals’ sounds, as well as from sonar devices. The volume of the swim bladder changes if fish move vertically, thus is also considered to be the site of pressure sensitivity. The latency of swim bladder adaptation after a change in pressure affects hearing and other possible swim bladder functions, presumably making audition more difficult. Nevertheless, the presence of the swim bladder and a relatively complex auditory apparatus allows the channel catfish to discern different sounds and tell from which directions sounds have come.

Communication to predators
Pectoral stridulation has been considered to be the main means of agonistic communication towards predators in channel catfish. Sudden, relatively loud sounds are used to startle predators in a manner analogous to the well-documented, visual flash display of various lepidopterans. In most catfish, a drumming sound can be produced for this use, and the incidences of the drumming sounds can reach up to 300 or 400 per second. However, the channel catfish must resort instead to stridulation sounds and pectoral spine display for predator avoidance. In addition to communication towards predators, stridulation can be seen as a possible alarm signal to other catfish, in the sense of warning nearby individuals that a predator is near.

Fishing

Channel catfish are omnivores, and can be caught using a variety of natural and prepared baits, including crickets, nightcrawlers, minnows, shad, freshwater drum, crawfish, frogs, bullheads, sunfish, chicken liver, hot dogs, and suckers. Catfish have even been known to take Ivory soap as bait and even raw steak.

Juglines, trotlines, limb lines, and bank lines are popular methods of fishing for channel catfish in addition to traditional rod-and-reel fishing. Another method uses traps, either "slat traps" — long wooden traps with an angled entrance — and wire hoop traps. Typical bait for these traps include rotten cheese and dog food, or "stink bait", and old rotted shad work well. Catches of as many as 100 fish a day are common in catfish traps. An unusual method practiced in the Southeastern United States is noodling – catching catfish by hand.

When removing the hook from a catfish, anglers should be mindful of the sharp spines on the pectoral and dorsal fins.

Genetics 
The channel catfish is one of only a handful of ostariophysan freshwater fish species whose genomes have been sequenced. The channel catfish reference genome sequence was generated alongside genomic sequence data for other scaled and unscaled fish species (other catfishes, the common pleco and southern striped Raphael; also common carp), in order to provide genomic resources and aid understanding of the evolutionary loss of scales in catfishes. Results from comparative genomics and transcriptomics analyses and experiments involving channel catfish have supported a role for secretory calcium-binding phosphoproteins (SCPP) in scale formation in teleost fishes.

In addition to the whole nuclear genome resources above, full mitochondrial genome sequences have been available for channel catfish since 2003. Other studies of genetic diversity, outcrossing, etc. in channel catfish have focused primarily on inbred lines and farm strains of relevance to the aquaculture of this species. For example, earlier studies have compared the genetic diversity of domestic versus wild populations of channel catfish using AFLPs.

References

Further reading

External links 

 
 

channel catfish
Freshwater fish of the United States
Taxa named by Constantine Samuel Rafinesque
channel catfish
Symbols of Kansas
Symbols of Missouri
Symbols of Iowa
Symbols of Nebraska